Phellolophium is a genus of flowering plants belonging to the family Apiaceae. It has only one species, Phellolophium madagascariense. Its native range is Madagascar.

References

Apioideae
Monotypic Apioideae genera